Guldensporen Stadion is a multi-use stadium in Kortrijk, Belgium.  It is currently used mostly for football matches and is the home ground of K.V. Kortrijk.  In the summer of 2008, following the promotion of KV Kortrijk to the Belgian First Division, the capacity of the stadium was increased from 6,896 to around 9,399 

The name Guldensporenstadion means "Stadium of the Golden Spurs," a reference to the medieval Battle of the Golden Spurs, fought in Kortrijk in 1302.

References

Football venues in Flanders
Sports venues in West Flanders
Buildings and structures in Kortrijk
K.V. Kortrijk
Sports venues completed in 1947